Visitation Articles in the Entire Electorate of Saxony are a Lutheran doctrinal statement written by Aegidius Hunnius and other theologians against Crypto-Calvinism on request of administrator Frederick William. They were written in 1592, and first published in German in 1593.

Until 1836 all teachers and ministers in Electoral Saxony were required to subscribe also to the Visitation Articles as a doctrinal norm.

External links
The Visitation Articles in English
The Saxon Visitation Articles 1592, Creeds of Christendom, with a History and Critical notes. Volume I, by Philip Schaff.
Articles of Visitation, article in Christian Cyclopedia

Lutheran texts
Christian statements of faith
Reformation in Germany
1593 in Christianity